Duncan Frasier was a "local bard" of whom very little is known. He lived circa 1270 AD. Depending on which ancient manuscript is considered, he either lived "on Cheviot as a mountain bard" or in Berwick. His writings are described as being written in Latin.

The Laidly Worm of Spindleston Heugh

The sole work attributed to Frasier is The Laidly Worm of Spindleston Heugh, of which he is allegedly the author. It is the tale of a loathsome (or in Geordie dialect, "laidly") giant monster, and was later modified by the Rev. Robert Lambe, Vicar of Norham and many other later writers.

The version by Lambe appears in Rhymes of Northern Bards edited by John Bell and published in 1812. Among the other early publication relating this tale are the 1809 version in “The Northumberland Garland” and “The Local Historian's Table Book of Remarkable Occurrences, Historical Facts, Traditions, Legendary and Descriptive Ballads, &c., &c., Connected with the Counties of Newcastle-upon-Tyne, Northumberland and Durham. Legendary Division. Vol. 1.” Collected by M.A. Richardson of Newcastle upon Tyne by in 1842.

See also 
Geordie dialect words

References

External links
The Laidly Worm of Spindleston Heugh
Rhymes of Northern Bards by John Bell Junior - on page 156

People from Newcastle upon Tyne (district)
Musicians from Tyne and Wear
13th-century births
Year of birth unknown
Year of death unknown